Kikagati is a town in the Western Region of Uganda. It sits across the Kagera River from the town of Murongo, in the Kagera Region of Tanzania.

Location
Kikagati is located in Isingiro District, Ankole sub-region, in southwestern Uganda. The town lies close to Uganda's border with Tanzania.

The geographical coordinates of the town are:01 02 42S, 30 40 07E (Latitude:-1.0450; Longitude:30.6686).

Overview
The small town of Kikagati, Isingiro District, southwestern Uganda, sits on Uganda's border with the Republic of Tanzania.

Garbage collection and disposal was a challenge as of June 2018, with residents dumping plastic waste and food residue on the roadside.

Points of interest
The following points of interest lie within the town limits or close to the edges of the town: (a) the offices of Kikagati Town Council (b) the International Border Crossing between Uganda and the Republic of Tanzania (c) the Kagera River forms the border between Uganda and Tanzania in some areas near Kikagati and (d) Kikagati Central Market, the source of fresh daily produce.

The southern end of the  Mbarara-Kikagati Road ends here. The road continues into Northern Tanzania as Highway B182. The western arm of the proposed Kobero–Bugene–Mutukula–Kikagati Road ends here.

The 16 megawatts Kikagati Power Station, across the Kagera River is currently under development, by Kikagati Power Company Limited, with the power to be shared equally between Uganda and Tanzania.

See also
Isingiro District
Isingiro

References

External links
Kikagati Town Council Stuck with Dilapidated Buildings As of 21 June 2018.

Populated places in Western Region, Uganda
Isingiro District
Tanzania–Uganda border crossings
Tanzania–Uganda relations